Alasdair Mackie "Algy" Ward (born 11 July 1959) is an English heavy metal bass guitarist and singer. He founded Tank, a part of the new wave of British heavy metal movement. He also played with the Damned and before that the Saints.

Career with The Saints
Alasdair Mackie Ward first rose to fame by joining the Australian punk rock band the Saints, replacing their former bassist Kym Bradshaw. Ward's first appearance with the band was in 1977 on their third single, "This Perfect Day." He also played on their second album Eternally Yours and third album Prehistoric Sounds, both released in 1978, when the band began to experiment with a jazzier R&B sound. A little after the release of Prehistoric Sounds, The Saints temporarily disbanded, and when the band got back together with their more post-punk driven sound, Ward was replaced by Janine Hall.

Career with The Damned 
After the Saints disintegrated, Ward joined the influential English punk band the Damned. The band recorded their comeback album Machine Gun Etiquette in 1979 and released it the same year. Critics and fans alike were pleasantly surprised and applauded the band for making a successful bounce back to the scene, with a new, developing gothic style of rock. Ward played on all the songs on the album. He played with the band for a short time after the album's release, even performing with the band on The Old Grey Whistle Test before he was fired from the group due to the strong animosity between himself and drummer Rat Scabies. He was replaced by former Eddie and the Hot Rods bassist Paul Gray.

Career with Tank 
During his career with the Damned and massively, infinitely influenced and inspired by Lemmy and his band Motörhead, Ward began to express interest in the burgeoning new wave of British heavy metal movement, which was kicked off by bands like Witchfynde and Saxon. Ward planned to create a new band, which he called Tank inspired and influenced by Motörhead. He hired Peter and Mark Brabbs to play with him, and in 1980 Tank was officially formed. In 1982, they released their debut album Filth Hounds of Hades recorded round Christmas and produced or rather unleashed by legendary Motörhead Guitarist Fast Eddie Clarke, which has been a landmark classic album in the NWOBHM movement. Shortly before their third record This Means War was released, Mick Tucker became the second guitarist, and shortly after the release, the Brabbs brothers left. They were replaced by Cliff Evans on guitar, Graeme Crallan on drums, and later Michael Bettel on drums.  After their fifth album (which was self-titled) was released in 1987, growing disputes over musical direction and lack of commercial success grew more frequent, which led the band to split in 1989.

Resurrection and second split-up 
In 1997, Tank reformed with Ward on vocals and bass, Bruce Bisland on drums, and Tucker and Evans on guitars. They recorded and released one more album as the original Tank, entitled Still At War in 2002. However, the reunion was short lived, as legal disputes and recording issues for their supposed seventh studio album Sturmpanzer caused the band to split up once again in 2006.

Dual Tanks 
In 2008, a new Tank was announced, fronted by Tucker and Evans. This Tank has recorded and released three new albums: War Machine in 2010, War Nation in 2012, and Valley of Tears in 2015. The band went on tour to support the album through 2016. In response to the new Tank, Ward created another Tank, in which he was the sole musician. Ward began to work on a new Tank album, which became Breath of the Pit, in 2013. Shortly after this, he teamed up with friend EVO from Warfare to record a six track EP entitled Damned unto Death released as simply EVO/ALGY. That same year, after years of rumors, Ward confirmed he was in the studio working on the eighth Tank album, Sturmpanzer which was released in November 2018.

References

English rock bass guitarists
Male bass guitarists
The Damned (band) members
Living people
1959 births
People from Croydon
Tank (band) members
The Saints (Australian band) members